Guy-Victor Duperré (20 February 1775 – 2 November 1846) was a French naval officer and Admiral of France.

He is known for commanding French naval forces in the Mauritius campaign of 1809–11 and was victorious in the Battle of Grand Port, where he was wounded. Later he had a command in the Mediterranean and continued to serve during and after the Bourbon Restoration. He commanded the naval elements of the expeditionary force that carried out the Invasion of Algiers in 1830 and went on to become Minister of the Navy three times.

Early years and education
Duperré was born on20 February 1775 in La Rochelle to Jean Augustin Duperré, counselor of the king and financer for war, and Marie-Gabrielle Prat-Desprez.

He spent a few years with the Oratory of Saint Philip Neri at the Collège de Juilly, before enlisting at 16 on the Henri IV, a French East Indiaman.

Career

Revolutionary wars
In November 1792, Duperré joined the French Navy at the beginning of the French Revolutionary Wars. He served against the Netherlands and Britain aboard the corvette Maire-Guiton, and later aboard the frigate Tortu. In May 1796, he was made an auxiliary ensign aboard the Virginie. In June, he was captured by the British during a night fight. He was exchanged two years later and made a full rank ensign, taking command of the corvette Pélagie.

In 1804, he was made a lieutenant de vaisseau, and later assistant of the préfet maritime of Boulogne-sur-Mer. In 1806, he served off Brazil aboard the Vétéran, under Jérôme Bonaparte. Back to France, he was promoted to capitaine de frégate on 28 September. In 1808, commanding the frigate Sirène, he led a troop convoy to Martinique; returning to France, he was intercepted by a British blockade off Lorient, and managed to escape by beaching his ship.

Napoléon made him a capitaine de vaisseau and knight of the Légion d'honneur, before promoting him to Commodore. On 6 December 1810, Duperré was made Baron of the Empire.

Duperré was sent to the Isle de France (now Mauritius) aboard the frigate Bellone, fighting several British ships in the process, notably the action of 3 July 1810. On 23 August 1810, he won the Battle of Grand Port, completely destroying a British squadron. He was wounded in this battle. The naval victory made its way on the Arc de Triomphe. In recognition, Duperré was promoted to contre-amiral when he returned to France in September 1811.

From 1812 to 1814, Duperré commanded the Italian and French naval forces in the Mediterranean and the Adriatic. In 1814, he defended Venice against Austria.

Bourbon restoration
Duperré was made Préfet maritime of Toulon during the Hundred Days, and was retired during the Bourbon Restoration. In 1818, he was brought back to active duty. He commanded the squadron which blockaded Cadiz during the war which reinstated Ferdinand VII of Spain on the throne. In October 1823, he was made vice-admiral, grand officier de la Légion d'honneur and Commander of the Order of Saint Louis in 1824. In 1827, he was made Préfet maritime of Brest and inspector of the 5th arrondissement militaire.

Though Duperré  was critical towards the expedition against Algiers, Charles X made him commander of the fleet which ferried troops under Bourmont to depose the Algerian Regency. The fleet of the invasion of Algiers and shipwreck of Dellys was 103 warships strong, with 572 freighters ferrying 35 000 soldiers, 3 800 horses and 91 heavy guns. In recognition for his role, Duperré was made pair de France on 16 July 1830.

July monarchy 
After the July Revolution, all pairages were cancelled as a whole. Duperré was reinstated pair de France by Louis-Philippe on 18 August 1830, and promoted to Admiral in March 1831. Then in Africa, Duperré was called back to France and made chief of the council of the Admiralty.

On 18 November 1834, Duperré became Naval Minister in Mortier's government. He retained the office in de Broglie's and Thiers' governments, and got out of office when Thiers' government collapsed on the 16 September 1836. Duperré came back to office on 12 May 1839 in Soult's second government. In 1840, a budget project for the Duke of Nemours was rejected, which made the government collapse; Duperré then said: "The ministry has received a round shot in the belly, which has gone to hit the wood of the Crown." Duperré came back again to the ministry on the 29 October 1840 in Soult's third government, until he retired for health reasons on 6 February 1843.

Death and honours
Duperré died on 2 November 1846 in Saint-Servan, Brittany. Admiral Jean Tupinier said a eulogy in the chamber of the pairs de France.

He was buried in the Invalides in a national funeral. 

His name is carved on the Arc de Triomphe in Paris.

References

Admirals of France
1775 births
People from La Rochelle
1846 deaths
Ministers of Marine and the Colonies
French naval commanders of the Napoleonic Wars
Peers of France
Barons of the First French Empire
Members of the Chamber of Peers of the Bourbon Restoration
Members of the Chamber of Peers of the July Monarchy
Grand Croix of the Légion d'honneur
Commanders of the Order of Saint Louis
Names inscribed under the Arc de Triomphe